Wildon Grange is a civil parish in the Hambleton district of North Yorkshire, England.

History 

Wildon Grange is first recorded in 1138 as Wyldon, meaning Wild Hill. The farming area of Wildon Grange was originally a possession of the monks of nearby Byland Abbey, being granted to them by Roger de Mowbray . Until 1866, Wildon Grange was a township that was mostly part of the Ecclesiastical parish of Coxwold, in the wapentake of Birdforth, in the North Riding of Yorkshire. Since 1866, it has been its own civil parish, and in 1974 was transferred to North Yorkshire as part of the Hambleton District.

Whinny Bank Road in the east of the parish, is the boundary into the North York Moors National Park, and also carries National Cycle Route 65, which runs from Hornsea to Middlesbrough.

Evidence of quarrying is in existence on the hill, which has shown the underlying ground to be composed of sandstone and limestone.

Notes

References

External links 

Civil parishes in North Yorkshire